Darboux Island is an island  long rising to , lying  west of Cape Perez off the west coast of Graham Land. It was discovered by the French Antarctic Expedition, 1903–05, and named by Jean-Baptiste Charcot for Jean Gaston Darboux, the noted French mathematician.

See also 
 List of Antarctic and sub-Antarctic islands

References 

Islands of Graham Land
Graham Coast